Kenneth Powell (8 April 1885 – 18 February 1915) was a British athlete and tennis player who competed in the 1908 and the 1912 Summer Olympics as well as at the Wimbledon Championships.

Tennis
Powell studied at Cambridge University and was a member of the 1905 Cambridge University Lawn Tennis Club which was captained by Tony Wilding. Powell became team captain in 1906 and 1907. In 1908 he won the single title at the Queen's Club Championships when his opponent in the final Major Ritchie retired in the second set. That year he also won the Covered Court Championships in Sweden.

Between 1905 and 1913 Powell competed in eight editions of the Wimbledon Championships. In the singles his best result was achieved during his last visit in 1913 when he defeated one of the favourites CP Dixon in the fourth round in five sets. In the quarterfinal the next day he lost in four sets to Oskar Kreuzer. In the doubles event he teamed up with his Canadian namesake Robert Powell and reached the semifinal of the All-Comers tournament in 1909 and the final in 1910.

At the 1908 Olympic Games in London he competed in the outdoor tennis singles event but lost his first round match to Otto Froitzheim. In the outdoor tennis doubles he and his partner Walter Crawley were eliminated in the quarterfinals.

Powell was a left-handed player with a break service and his main strength was his excellent volley as well as his speed and agility. His backhand shot was a comparative weakness.

Athletics and other sports
In 1908 he also participated in the 110 metre hurdles competition but was eliminated in the first round. Four years later in 1912 he finished fifth in the 110 metre hurdles competition. Powell was an all-round sportsman who captained the school fifteen at Rugby and was honoured as Victor Ludorum for athletics for two consecutive years. He played rackets, reaching the final of the public schools competition in 1903, and was a member of his school gymnastic eight.

Death
On 18 February 1915 Powell was killed in action during the First World War, serving as a private with the Honourable Artillery Company, when he was struck by a bullet near Ypres. He is buried in the Commonwealth War Graves section of the churchyard at Loker.

See also
 List of Olympians killed in World War I

References

External links

1885 births
1915 deaths
Athletes (track and field) at the 1908 Summer Olympics
Athletes (track and field) at the 1912 Summer Olympics
English male tennis players
British military personnel killed in World War I
Honourable Artillery Company soldiers
Olympic athletes of Great Britain
Olympic tennis players of Great Britain
Tennis players at the 1908 Summer Olympics
People from Hampstead
Athletes from London
English male hurdlers
British male tennis players
Tennis people from Greater London
British Army personnel of World War I
Deaths by firearm in Belgium